Match of the Day (abbreviated to MOTD) is a football highlights programme, typically broadcast on BBC One on Saturday nights, during the Premier League season. The show's current presenter is former England international striker Gary Lineker.

It is one of the BBC's longest-running shows, having been on air since 22 August 1964. In 2015, Guinness World Records recognised it "as the longest-running football television programme in the world." The show's theme tune was voted the most recognised TV theme tune in a 2010 poll conducted by the PRS.

History

1960s 
Although the title was first used by the BBC for its Wimbledon tennis highlights programme in June 1964, the first football-related edition of Match of the Day was screened on BBC Two on 22 August 1964, and showed highlights of a game between Liverpool and Arsenal at Anfield. The programme's audience was estimated at only 20,000, less than half of the attendance at the ground.

Match of the Day was not universally welcomed in the football world; in 1965 several clubs attempted to block a renewed deal with the BBC in fear of a drop in gate attendances at matches. Eventually, a compromise was reached where the BBC agreed not to reveal which match was to be shown until after the day's play had concluded. Following the success of the England team at the 1966 FIFA World Cup, the programme was moved from BBC 2 to BBC 1 for the start of the 1966–1967 season. The first colour edition of Match of the Day on BBC 1 was shown on 15 November 1969, where it featured a game between Liverpool and West Ham United. However, the very first colour edition was shown on 2 November 1968, when the programme moved back to BBC 2  for one week, and a game between Chelsea and Manchester City was featured (BBC 2 was transmitted on 625 lines capable of showing colour).

1970s and 1980s 
Slow motion replays were first introduced in 1969. However, at the end of the decade the BBC lost a significant share of matches, with a new four-year deal in 1979 splitting the rights between the BBC and ITV (ITV had originally won exclusive rights, but a ruling from the Office of Fair Trading ordered that the rights be split). Match of the Day was moved to Sunday afternoons for the 1980–81 and 1982–83 seasons.

In 1983, the programme reverted to being shown on Saturday night, although that year four broadcasts were lost due to industrial action. The season 1983–84 also saw the first Match of the Day Live broadcasts of First Division matches, beginning with Manchester United vs Tottenham Hotspur on 16 December – a Friday evening fixture. This came some two months after the start of ITV's Big Match Live.

1990s and 2000s 
League football highlights were not available to the BBC from 1988 as ITV had exclusive rights, though the programme remained on air for the FA Cup as Match of the Day: The Road to Wembley. League football returned in 1992, for the start of the Premier League era. Sky's emergence made the TV rights market more competitive, with the BBC losing European Cup matches after UEFA's revamping as the Champions League in 1992, although it did broadcast the 1994 final between A.C. Milan and FC Barcelona. In 1997, the BBC lost all live rights to the FA Cup meaning the programme's live coverage was restricted to the UEFA Cup and Cup Winners' Cup matches, the latter competition becoming defunct in 1999. However, the BBC were still able to show Saturday evening highlights of FA Cup games. A significant change occurred in 2001 when the Premier League awarded highlights rights to ITV in a three-year contract. Between 2001 and 2004, the Match of the Day brand was used for the BBC's live football coverage and the network had earned some consolation in losing by managing to regain live terrestrial coverage of the FA Cup and England internationals for that period.

Rights for UEFA Champions League qualifiers, which are held by the home team and fall outside the rights for the competition proper, were obtained on an ad hoc basis for English teams in this period, which is currently the case for the BBC with Scottish and Northern Irish teams. Both legs of Manchester United's 2002–03 third round qualifying matches against Zalaegerszeg were shown live on the BBC.

From the 2004–05 season, Premier League highlights returned to the BBC in a revived MOTD. In addition, Match of the Day 2 was launched, which showed highlights of the increasing number of Sunday fixtures, and was initially presented by Adrian Chiles. The BBC's broadcasting rights were renewed in 2009, allowing them to continue showing Match of the Day until 2013.

2010s 
From the 2011–12 season, a web-only Match of the Day 3 programme was launched on Monday mornings as a light-hearted addition to Match of the Day 2. Although broadcast as a separate programme, it is recorded immediately following the conclusion of Match of the Day 2 on Sunday night. In November 2011, Match of the Day moved from London to a brand new studio in Dock10, MediaCityUK as part of BBC Sport's relocation north, this allowed the programme to be recorded in high-definition. At the start of 2012–13 season Match of the Day 2 moved to BBC One.

Upon regaining the FA Cup rights in 2014, highlights from the early and later rounds of the competition were given their own separate programme instead of being broadcast on an extended Match of the Day straight after the Premier League highlights, as it was before the BBC last lost the rights in 2008. Highlights of the latter rounds occasionally sequence from the Premier League highlights, as they did until the previous decade, but both segments are considered separate programmes.

In January 2018, the Premier League awarded the UK highlights to BBC Sport. The rights cost £211.5 million and were to cover three seasons from 2019–20. The January 2018 agreement also includes Match of the Day 2, Match of the Day 2 Extra, Match of the Day Kickabout, Football Focus, Final Score, and The Premier League Show.

2020s 
During the COVID-19 pandemic and the postponement of the 2019–20 Premier League season, Match of the Day split into a televised podcast called Match of the Day: Top 10 Podcast in which Gary Lineker and the pundits discussed and ranked certain roles from the start of the Premier League in 1992 (such as Top 10 Goalkeepers) and Match of their Day which featured a pundit picking three of their favourite Premier League matches. Upon its resumption, the BBC broadcast four games live. Bournemouth versus Crystal Palace became the first Premier League game shown live on one of the five main terrestrial channels, and the BBC's first live top-flight English football match since 1987–88. A further eight games were shown live during the 2020–21 season.

In March 2023, Lineker was suspended following political controversy over a tweet he had made criticising UK government policy, which the BBC argued breached guidelines over social media use by employees and freelancers. Controversy began to mount over the BBC's decision to remove Lineker from the broadcast, with the suggestion being that Lineker was singled out for speaking against government policy. Several presenters, pundits, and commentators, including Alex Scott, Ian Wright and Alan Shearer, refused to participate in the BBC's football output, while some football clubs announced their refusal to conduct BBC interviews. Radio and television programming across BBC Sport's football division was severely disrupted on 11 March, while BBC director general Tim Davie apologised to viewers for the disruption. Both Match of the Day and Match of the Day 2, presented the following day, followed a shortened format with no studio presentation, punditry, or interviews. On 13 March Lineker was reinstated as host of Match of the Day and the BBC undertook to start a review of its social media guidelines.

Studio 
The programme was broadcast from TC5 at BBC Television Centre from 1964–2012.

Ahead of the 2019–20 Premier League season, BBC Sport upgraded the studio that Match of the Day, Match of the Day 2, Football Focus, and Final Score broadcasts from.

Filming is located at the Dock10 studios at MediaCityUK in Salford.

Presenters, analysts, and commentators 
Despite the programme's long running status there have only been five regular main presenters: Kenneth Wolstenholme (1964–1967), 
David Coleman (1967–1973), Jimmy Hill (1973–1988), Des Lynam (1988–1999) and 
Gary Lineker (since 1999). Lineker had worked as an analyst during his predecessor Des Lynam's tenure. Mark Chapman, Gabby Logan, and Dan Walker have stood in for Lineker.

The predominant analysts for the 2021–22 season are Alan Shearer, Jermaine Jenas, Martin Keown, Danny Murphy, Micah Richards, and Ian Wright. Each live show typically features three analysts; highlights shows usually have two analysts.

Match of the Day uses a selection of BBC and freelance commentators, including: Guy Mowbray, Steve Wilson, Jonathan Pearce, Steve Bower, Simon Brotherton, Conor McNamara, Vicki Sparks, Alistair Mann, Martin Fisher, Mark Scott, John Roder, Chris Wise, Robyn Cowen, Steven Wyeth, and Ben Andrews.

In 2007, Jacqui Oatley became the first woman to commentate on the programme.

Previous commentators have included Walley Barnes, Frank Bough, David Coleman, Jon Champion, Barry Davies, Tony Gubba, Stuart Hall, John Motson, Alan Parry, Idwal Robling, Gerald Sinstadt, Clive Tyldesley, Alan Weeks, and Kenneth Wolstenholme. As part of the show's 50th anniversary celebrations, Barry Davies returned to commentate.

Theme music
The current theme tune for the series is titled "Match of the Day". It was composed for the programme in 1970 by Barry Stoller, and was used for the first time on 15 August 1970.

Stoller's brief was simply to write "something good"; the short closing fanfare occurred to him first.  "Those fanfare harmonies give the music a gladiator feel," he wrote in 2014, "akin to entering the ancient games arena in Rome with all its expectations."  The tune was recorded by him, a trumpeter, and a drummer (Stuart Vincent) in the basement recording studio of his home. In May 2010, PRS for Music revealed that the Match of the Day theme tune is the most recognisable in the UK.

The theme is often incorrectly labelled "Off Side", the group name used by musician Mike Vickers, for an alternative 1970 version of Stoller's tune, which was released as a 45 rpm gramophone single on the Pye label (7N 25534),

The original theme tune, entitled "Drum Majorette", was written by Major Leslie Statham, a former band member of the Welsh Guards under the pen-name Arnold Steck.

Related shows 
Since 1998, the BBC's coverages of the FIFA World Cup and the UEFA European Championship have been under the Match of the Day banner.
Between 1995 and 1999, the BBC broadcast Match of the Seventies (1995–96), Match of the Eighties (1997) and Match of the Nineties (1999). Each series acted as a chronological review of seasons through each decade, presented in a slightly off-beat style, and relied heavily on footage originally included in Match of the Day broadcasts. Presenters included Dennis Waterman, Danny Baker, Mark Radcliffe, and Marc Riley.
From the 2004–05 season, a second programme, Match of the Day 2, usually airs on the following Sunday.
From the 2009–10 season until 2015–16, the BBC picked up the rights for the Football League highlights and up until 2011–12, ten live Championship games and three live League Cup games.  Live games were broadcast under the Match of the Day Live banner, but highlights were shown on a new dedicated programme named The Football League Show (or, for League Cup games, The League Cup Show).
From the 2013–14 season, American channel NBCSN has broadcast its own version also called Match of the Day.
From the 2016–17 season until the 2018–19 season, The Premier League Show typically airs on Thursday nights during the Premier League season.
From the 2019–20 season, a spin-off show MOTDx was launched, focussing on celebrities, music, fashion and culture of the Premier League. It is presented by Jermaine Jenas, alongside Chelcee Grimes, Craig Mitch and Reece Parkinson.

Match of the Day Annual 
A Match of the Day Annual book is also produced.

References

Further reading

External links 

 
 Behind the scenes with the Match of the Day commentary team
 Unofficial Match of the Day fan-website
 

1964 British television series debuts
1960s British sports television series
1970s British sports television series
1980s British sports television series
1990s British sports television series
2000s British sports television series
2010s British sports television series
2020s British sports television series
BBC Sport
BBC Television shows
Black-and-white British television shows
English football on television
English Football League on television
Football mass media in the United Kingdom
Premier League on television